Ernst Linder (25 April 1868 – 14 September 1943) was a Swedish general of Finnish descent who served in the Swedish Army from 1887 to 1918, after which he participated in the Finnish Civil War as the commander of the Satakunta and Savo army groups, whose responsibility stretched from Finland's western coast adjoining the Gulf of Bothnia to Näsijärvi. Linder was friends with the White Commander, Marshal Gustaf Mannerheim. Following the war, he served as Inspector of Cavalry until retiring in 1920.

Linder was promoted into the rank of Major General on 13 April 1918, Lieutenant General in 1938, and General of Cavalry in 1940.

In the Winter War, the 71-year-old Linder led the Swedish Volunteer Corps from 6 January to 27 February 1940, after which he functioned as a commander of the Salla area.

In addition to his military career, Linder was an accomplished horse rider who competed in the 1924 Summer Olympics, where he and his horse Piccolomino won the gold medal in individual dressage.

Linder is buried at Norra begravningsplatsen in Stockholm.

References 

1868 births
1943 deaths
People from Raseborg
People from Uusimaa Province (Grand Duchy of Finland)
Swedish people of Finnish descent
Swedish dressage riders
Equestrians at the 1924 Summer Olympics
Olympic equestrians of Sweden
Swedish male equestrians
Olympic gold medalists for Sweden
People of the Finnish Civil War (White side)
Swedish Army major generals
Finnish military personnel
Finnish generals
Olympic medalists in equestrian
Volunteers in the Winter War
Swedish military attachés
Medalists at the 1924 Summer Olympics

Burials at Norra begravningsplatsen